Shark River Draw is a moveable bridge over the Shark River Inlet, an inlet at the mouth of the Shark River in the towns of Belmar and Avon-by-the-Sea  Monmouth County, New Jersey, United States, just west of the Atlantic Ocean.

The bascule bridge carries NJ Transit Rail Operations North Jersey Coast Line between the Bradley Beach and Belmar stations. The bridge was built in 1937 by the New York and Long Branch Railroad. It underwent major rehabilitation in 2013–2014.

The drawbridge runs parallel and downstream to the fixed crossing of the New Jersey Route 35 and upstream of the moveable crossing of New Jersey Route 71 bridge to the east, together with which it is subject to the opening regulations as set out in Title 33 of the Code of Federal Regulations.

See also
 NJT movable bridges
 List of crossings of the Raritan River

References 

Railroad bridges in New Jersey
NJ Transit bridges
Bascule bridges in the United States
Belmar, New Jersey
Avon-by-the-Sea, New Jersey
Bridges in Monmouth County, New Jersey
Bridges completed in 1937
Central Railroad of New Jersey
Pennsylvania Railroad bridges
1937 establishments in New Jersey